Shake, Rattle & Roll V is a 1994 Filipino horror anthology film and the fifth installment of the Shake, Rattle & Roll film series. It was distributed by Regal Films, and was directed by Manny Castañeda, Don Escudero and Jose Javier Reyes. The film is an entry of the 1994 Metro Manila Film Festival.

The sixth installment, Shake, Rattle & Roll VI, was released in 1997.

Plot

"Maligno"
Madam Ceres (Cita Astals), a tarot reader, advises Laurie (Ruffa Gutierrez) about the consequences of her beauty. 

One day, Laurie and her friend, Nicky (Bong Regala) take a vacation on a secluded island with their helpers, Mang Isko (Angel Confiado) and Aling Sela (Rustica Carpio). On the day they are supposed to leave, their boat never comes and there is no other way to contact them. In an argument, Laurie leaves Nicky and goes into the woods. Before she ventures further, she is spotted by Mang Isko and stops her from going in even more. Laurie talks to Aling Sela at her house. Laurie tells her about the woods but Aling Sela talks to her that she shouldn't go back as well.

That night, Laurie goes back into the woods and encounters a man (Monsour del Rosario) playing an instrument and gestures to come with him. Before she comes closer, she is spotted by Nicky and tells her that they should go back and sleep and the man suddenly disappears. The next day, Laurie wakes up to find that Nicky has grown ill. He is treated by Aling Basyon (Aida Carmona), the island's healer. When Laurie tells Mang Isko and Aling Sela what happened, Aling Basyon advises her not to go back, never go with the man and never eat his food, because he's not actually a human.

In an act of desperation, Laurie decides to ask for the man's help. She finds him at the same tree he was at last night and he tells her to follow him to a healer. While traveling through the woods, Laurie asks for the man's name, guessing that it's Victor, which is right. When they arrive at a house in the woods, they go inside. Victor tells her about his home and that they should rest before talking about Nicky. Laurie, suspicious, turns down his offer to live in the house. Victor insists that they should stay and eat, giving Laurie a grape. Laurie refuses and escapes, much to Victor's dismay, and turns into his real self.

When Laurie arrives back home, Aling Basyon tells her that it's Victor who caused Nicky's illness because he wants to take Laurie away. He appears as Laurie's wants in her life to take her away and that everything Laurie sees is fake. Aling Basyon decides to guide Laurie into a cave, full of the remains of Victor's victims, and warns Laurie to be cautious of him. At nighttime, Aling Basyon tries to help Nicky again, only to find that critters are living inside him and that his condition is getting worse.

During this, all of them hear Victor's whispers, so Laurie decides to stop him once and for all. When Laurie decides to call Victor's name, she is suddenly transported into his house. Victor tells her that Nicky will only go back to normal if Laurie decides to live with him forever. Laurie refuses and will only agree if Victor will show his true self, which he does in desperation. As the wind grows stronger by Victor's power, trees come crashing down to hurt Laurie. When he realizes what he's doing, he decides to stop and tells Laurie to go back to Nicky because he can't stand to hurt her any longer.

When Laurie goes back to the house, she is greeted with a cured Nicky and they celebrate after stopping the curse.

"Anino"
Madam Ceres asks Gina (Sheryl Cruz) to be patient with her older sister, Mowie (Jaclyn Jose). 

One day, Mowie and Gina along with their cousin, Elmer (Dingdong Dantes) and the houseboy, Mitoy (Ogie Diaz), has rented a cheap yet big house. When Gina's friend senses a feeling in the house, Gina is the first one who grow curiosity about the house. Throughout their stay, each member of the household starts feeling the weird sense. Mitoy quits his job because of this. Gina and Elmer ask the neighbor about the history of the house and it turns out that, that the previous owner was killed by his wife as a self-defense. The two siblings tell Mowie, who was reluctant before, that the house is haunted, Mowie insists that they couldn't afford to move out right away. The same night, Mowie lets Gina sleep in her room, but a loud pound is heard by the door. The two sisters refused to answer and the Shadow person attacks Elmer instead and knocks him out. Mowie and Gina open the door and finally see the Shadow person that has been haunting them. Both of them are attacked but managed to escape the room. They wake Elmer up to get out of the house. As they reach outside with their neighbors who are watching and helping them break out. The Shadow person is last seen inside Mowie's room.

"Impakto"
Lizbeth (Manilyn Reynes) is warned about the people in her life who might be a traitor. 

Two rich opposite siblings, Lizbeth and Charlie (Tom Taus, Jr.) are kidnapped with the help of their driver and his two accomplices. But when their car breaks down in the middle of the night, the kidnappers decided to stay in an old abandoned hotel to hide and await for sunrise. Unbeknownst to them, Andres (Chuck Perez) the Impakto is residing in the area. He previously killed a woman before their arrival, and Pido, a homeless man witnesses it. When the three kidnappers are killed by the Impakto, Lizbeth and Charlie are lost in the hotel and they meet Andres who introduced himself as the owner of the hotel. However, they find out that Andres is an Impakto who is after them, they escape with the help of Pido who confronts and defeats Andres. As the sun rises, Lizbeth and Charlie, and Pido part ways and leave the hotel. Andres appears again, seemingly alive and healthy.

Epilogue 
Gina decides to visit Madam Ceres again. However, she finds out that the Madam Ceres she talked to before, is dead. As told by her sister (Malou Crisologo), the actual Madam Ceres, another tarot reader.

Cast

 Cita Astals as Madam Ceres
 Malou Crisologo as Madam Ceres II

Maligno
 Ruffa Gutierrez as Laurie
 Monsour del Rosario as Victor
 Bong Regala as Nicky
 Angel Confiado as Mang Isko
 Rustica Carpio as Aling Sela
 Aida Carmona as Aling Basyon

Anino
 Sheryl Cruz as Gina
 Jaclyn Jose as Mowie
 Ogie Diaz as Mitoy
 Patrick Riego de Dios as Alan
 Dingdong Dantes as Elmer
 Ana Abad Santos as Kaye
 Eva Darren as Mrs. Pineda
 Len Ag Santos as Alice Chua
 George Lim as Rod Chua
 Cherry Cornel as Evelyn
 Oscar Moran as Anino

Impakto
 Manilyn Reynes as Lizbeth
 Chuck Perez as Andres
 Tom Taus, Jr. as Charlie
 Michelle Ortega as Andres' girlfriend
 Archie Adamos as kidnapper
 Nonong de Andres as Pido
 Don Pepot as Dencio
 Lilia Cuntapay as woman in the bathroom
 Romy Romulo as kidnapper

Accolades

See also
Shake, Rattle & Roll (film series)
List of ghost films

References

External links

1994 horror films
1994 films
Philippine horror films
1990s comedy horror films
Regal Entertainment films
1994 comedy films